A suit is a set of garments with matching pieces, typically a jacket and trousers.

Suit or suits may also refer to:

 Suit (cards), one of four groups into which a deck of cards is divided
 Lawsuit, an action brought before a court to recover a right or redress a grievance

Arts and media
 Suit (album), a 2004 album by Nelly
 Suits (album), a 1994 album by Fish
 Suits (film), a 1999 American comedy film
 Suits (American TV series), a 2011 series on the USA Network
 Suits (South Korean TV series), a Korean remake of the U.S. series
 Suits (Japanese TV series), a Japanese remake of the U.S. series
 Suits (Arabic TV series), an Egyptian remake of the U.S. series
 "Suit & Tie", a song by Justin Timberlake

Clothing
 Beekeeping suit, worn by an apiarist to prevent stings when handling honeybees
 Boilersuit, or coverall, a loose-fitting one-piece clothing
 Diving suit, for use under water
 Dry suit, for use in colder water, or where hazardous chemicals may be encountered
 Wetsuit, for use in warmer water
 Environmental suit, a clothing used for a particular activity or environment
 Jumpsuit, a one-piece clothing with sleeves and legs
 Leisure suit
 Racing suit, a special clothing worn by racing drivers during races
 Ski suit, for skiing
 Space suit, for use in outer space
 Swimsuit, a clothing for use in water sports or sunbathing

See also
 Suite (disambiguation)

fr:Combinaison